This article details the qualifying phase for Powerlifting at the 2016 Summer Paralympics.  The competition at these Games will comprise a total of 180 athletes coming from their respective NPCs; each has been allowed to enter a maximum of 16 (eight for men, eight for women, and in either case, one per division). 140 will be awarded places based on world rankings in 2016, while 40 are made available to NPCs through a Bipartite Commission Invitation.

The top 8 men and top 6 women from the world rankings in each division earn a quota a place, always ensuring that the NPC is subjected to a limit of 1 lifter per division. If an NPC contains more than a single male athlete ranked in the top 8, or a single female in the top 6 of the world ranking list, the NPC can decide which of their athletes obtain the quota places

Summary

{| class="wikitable" style="font-size:90%;"
|-
!rowspan=2|NPC
!colspan=10|Men
!colspan=10|Women
!rowspan=2|Total
|- style="font-size:95%"
!49 Kg
!54 Kg
!59 Kg
!65 Kg
!72 Kg
!80 Kg
!88 Kg
!97 Kg
!107 Kg
!+107 Kg
!41 Kg
!45 Kg
!50 Kg
!55 Kg
!61 Kg
!67 Kg
!73 Kg
!79 Kg
!86 Kg
!+86 Kg
|- align=center
|align=left|
|
| 
| 
| X
|
|
|
|
|
|
|
|
|
|
|
|
|
|
|
|
|1
|- align=center
|align=left|
|
| 
| 
| X
|
|
|
|
| X
| X
|
|
|
|
|
|
|
|
|
|
|3
|- align=center
|align=left|
|
| X
|
|
|
|
| X
|
|
|
|
|
|
|
|
|
|
|
|
|
| 2
|- align=center
|align=left|
|
|
| X 
|
|
|
|
|
|
|
|
|
|
|
|
|
|
|
|
|
| 1
|- align=center
|align=left|
|
| X
| X
| X
| X
| X
| X
| X
| X
|
| X
| X
| X
| X
| X
| X
|
| X
| X
|
| 16
|- align=center
|align=left|
| 
| 
| 
|
| 
|
|
|
|
| 
|
|
|
| 
| X
| 
| 
| X
|
|
| 2
|- align=center
|align=left|
|
| 
| 
|
|
| X
|
| 
|
|
|
| 
| 
|
|
|
|
|
|
|
| 1
|- align=center
|align=left|
|
| X
|
| 
|
|
|
| 
| 
|
|
| 
|
|
|
| 
| 
|
|
|
| 1
|- align=center
|align=left|
|
|
| X
| X
| X
| X
| X
| X
| X
| X
| X
| X
| X
|
|
| X
| X
| X
| X
| X
| 16
|- align=center
|align=left|
| X
|
|
|
|
|
|
|
|
|
|
|
|
|
|
|
| X
|
|
| 
| 2
|- align=center
|align=left|
|
| 
| X
| X
|
|
|
|
|
|
|
| X
|
| X
|
|
|
|
|
|
| 4
|- align=center
|align=left|
|
| X
| X
| X
|
|
|
|
| X
| X
|
|
|
|
|
|
|
|
|
|
|5
|- align=center
|align=left|
| X
|
|
|
|
|
|
|
|
|
|
|
|
|
|
|
|
|
|
|
|1
|- align=center
|align=left|
| X
|
|
|
|
|
|
|
|
|
|
|
|
|
|
|
|
|
|
|
|1
|- align=center
|align=left|
|
|
| 
|
| 
| 
|
|
|
|
| X
|
|
|
|
|
|
|
|
| 
| 1
|- align=center
|align=left|
|
| 
| 
| X
|
|
| X
| X
| X
| X
|
|
|
|
|
|
|
|
|
|
|5
|- align=center
|align=left|
|
| 
|
| 
| X
|
|
| X
|
|
|
|
|
|
|
|
|
|
|
|
|2
|- align=center
|align=left|
| X
|
| 
|
| X
|
| X
|
| X
| X
|
|
|
|
|
|
|
|
| X
| 
| 6
|- align=center
|align=left|
|
| 
|
|
|
|
|
|
| 
|
|
|
|
|
|
| X
|
|
|
|
| 1
|- align=center
|align=left|
|
| X
|
|
|
|
|
|
| X
|
|
|
|
|
|
|
|
|
|
|
|2
|- align=center
|align=left|
|
| 
| 
|
|
| 
| 
| X
| X
|
|
|
|
|
|
|
|
|
|
|
| 2
|- align=center
|align=left|
|
| 
| 
|
|
| X
|
| X
|
|
|
|
| X
| X
|
|
|
| X
| X
|
|6
|- align=center
|align=left|
|
| 
| 
|
|
| 
| X
|
|
|
|
|
|
|
|
|
|
|
|
|
| 1
|- align=center
|align=left|
|
|
| 
|
| 
| 
|
|
|
|
|
|
|
|
|
|
|
|
|
| X
| 1
|- align=center
|align=left|
| X
| X
| X
|
| X
| X
| X
| X
|
|
| X
| X
| 
| X
| X
| 
| X
| X
| X
| X
| 15
|- align=center
|align=left|
|
|
| X
| X
| X
| X
|
|
|
|
|
| X
|
|
| X
|
|
|
|
| X
| 7
|- align=center
|align=left|
| X
| 
| X
|
| X
|
|
|
|
| X
|
|
|
| X
| X
| X
| X
| X
| X
| X
| 11
|- align=center
|align=left|
| 
| 
| 
|
| 
|
|
|
|
| 
|
|
|
| 
| X
|
|
|
|
|
| 1
|- align=center
|align=left|
| X
|
|
|
|
|
|
|
|
| X
|
|
|
|
|
| X
|
|
|
| X
| 4
|- align=center
|align=left|
|
|
| 
| 
| 
| 
| 
| 
| 
| 
| 
| 
| X
|
|
|
|
|
|
|
| 1
|- align=center
|align=left|
|
|
| 
|
| 
| X
|
|
|
|
| X 
|
|
|
|
| X
|
|
|
|
| 3
|- align=center
|align=left|
|
| 
|
| 
| X
|
|
|
|
|
|
|
|
|
|
|
| X
|
|
|
| 2
|- align=center
|align=left|
|
| X
|
|
|
|
|
|X
|
|
| X
| X
| X
| X
| X
|
| X
|
|
|
| 8
|- align=center
|align=left|
|
| 
| 
|
|
| 
| X
|
|
| X
|
|
|
|
|
|
|
|
|
|
|2
|- align=center
|align=left|
|
|
| 
|
| 
| X
|
| 
| 
|
|
|
|
|
|
|
|
|
|
|
| 1
|- align=center
|align=left|
| X
| X
|
| 
| 
|
|
|
|
| 
| 
|
| X 
| 
|
|
|
|
|
|
| 3
|- align=center 
|align=left| Total NPCs 
|8
|8
|8
|8
|8
|8
|8
|8
|8
|8
|6
|6
|6
|6
|7
|6
|6
|6
|6
|6
| 141
|}

Men's events

49 Kg

54 Kg

59 Kg

65 Kg

72 Kg

80 Kg

88 Kg

97 Kg

107 Kg

+107 Kg

Women's events

41 Kg

45 Kg

50 Kg

55 Kg

61 Kg

67 Kg

73 Kg

79 Kg

86 Kg

+86 Kg

References

2016 in weightlifting
Qualification